Olenellidae is an extinct family of redlichiid trilobite arthropods. Olenellids lived during the late Lower Cambrian (Botomian/Toyonian) in the so-called Olenellus-zone in the former paleocontinent of  Laurentia plus parts of what became the Famatinian orogen in what is now Argentina. This family can be distinguished from most other Olenellina by the partial merger of the frontal (L3) and middle pair (L2) of lateral lobes of the central area of the cephalon, that is called glabella, creating two isolated slits.

Key to the subfamilies

References 

 
Olenelloidea
Trilobite families
Cambrian first appearances
Cambrian Series 2 extinctions